Goniothalamus amuyon is a species of plant in the family Annonaceae. It is native to the Philippines. In the provinces of Batangas and Bohol it is commonly referred to as amúyong or amúyon.  In the Ilocos region and Pangasinan province it is commonly referred to as sagiát. Francisco Manuel Blanco, the Spanish Augustinian friar and botanist who first formally described the species using the basionym Uvaria amuyon, named it after its Tagalog name.

Description
It is a tree reaching 3 to 15 meters in height.  Its lance-shaped leaves are hairless and come to a point at their tips.  The leaves are arranged in an alternate pattern. Its flowers are solitary, or sometimes in pairs, and axillary.  It has 3 fleshy, green sepals. It has 6 long, greenish-yellow, fleshy petals arranged in two rows of 3.  The inner petals unite to form a cone. Its flowers have more than 100 stamen with no filaments. The anthers are attached directly to the receptacle and arranged in a triangle. Its gynoecium consist of 14 to 18 pistils that lack styles.  Its stigma are long, curved and ribbed.  Its oval fruit are about an inch long and have 3 - 5 cinnamon colored seeds. The fruit have a mild pleasant smell.

Reproductive biology
The pollen of G. amuyon is shed as permanent tetrads. Seed germination in laboratory conditions has been optimized at 30°C in light for 4 weeks.

Uses
It is reported as being widely used as a traditional medicine for a variety of ailments.  However, extracts containing bioactive molecules have been observed to have cytotoxic activity against cancer cells and teratogenic potential in studies with mice.

References

Annonaceae
Flora of the Philippines
Traditional medicine
Plants described in 1915
Taxa named by Francisco Manuel Blanco